William Pickens (January 15, 1881 – April 6, 1954) was an American orator, educator, journalist, and essayist. He wrote multiple articles and speeches, and penned two autobiographies, first The Heir of Slaves in 1911 and second Bursting Bonds in 1923, in which he mentioned race-motivated attacks on African Americans, both in the urban riots of 1919 and by lynching in 1921. His works called for the liberty and emancipation of African Americans. He devoted much of his life traveling the world as a spokesperson for the freedom of African Americans, and worked to promote the beliefs of W.E.B Dubois.

Biography
Pickens, the son of freed slaves and tenant farmers, was born on January 15, 1881, in Anderson County, South Carolina but mostly raised in Arkansas. Before Pickens moved to Arkansas, he received a basic education. The entire first year in Arkansas, he was kept home to help his parents with field work to pay off their debt.

In the winter of 1890, Pickens and his family moved to Argenta. His mother moved him and his siblings so that they might have an improved education and more opportunities to succeed. This move allowed Pickens to gain more knowledge and meet new people.  In Argenta, the school terms lasted for nine months, which allowed Pickens more time to learn. Before attending the school in Argenta, Pickens taught himself to write. He began his first term at his new school three months late, but soon developed a newfound appreciation for education and studying. Even though he started school in Argenta later than his classmates, within three months Pickens became the leader of the class, holding the highest rank. He always made a one hundred for his daily average in mathematics.

Pickens received a gift from one of his teachers for his punctuality and perfect attendance at the end of his first school year. The gift was a novel by Charles Beezly entitled Our Manners and Social Customs. This was the first book Pickens read for pleasure, as it was not related to his school texts. 

At the start of Pickens' fourth year at the Argenta school, when he was only thirteen years old, his mother passed away. Her death was caused by physical exploitation, ill treatment, and life-threatening health conditions. Her passing left Pickens with confusion and sorrow, but he was reassured by God that his mother wanted him to succeed and would still want him to continue his work without her there to support him. This thinking instilled in him confidence and faith in his abilities.

When Pickens began high school in Argenta, he soon became first in his class for Algebra. Jealous of his success, Pickens' classmates ridiculed and teased him. But Pickens kept working and did not allow their contempt for his grades and abilities to dissuade him from studying. Their teasing only motivated him to put in more work and make a name for himself. 

He studied at multiple schools, mostly in Argenta, Arkansas. He received bachelor's degrees from Talladega College (1902) and Yale University (1904), where he was inducted into Phi Beta Kappa and awarded the Henry James Ten Eyck Prize; a master's degree from Fisk University (1908); and a Litt. D from Selma University in 1915.

In 1911, he published his first autobiography entitled The Heir of Slaves, which detailed his experiences as a Black man living in the late nineteenth and early twentieth century. In 1920, he joined the National Association for the Advancement of Colored People (NAACP). He was a member for over two decades.

In 1923, he published a second edition of his autobiography entitled Bursting Bonds, which became his most well-known published work.

Throughout his later life, he traveled the world as a spokesman to "arouse colored people from the lethargy which hovered over them during the early decades of the twentieth century." In his lectures to fellow Black people, Pickens furthered the views of W.E.B. Dubois and advocated for the freedom of his race.

He married the former Minnie Cooper McAlpin(e), and they had three children, William, Harriet, and Ruby. Harriet Pickens would go on to be one of the first two African American women officers in the US Navy. Pickens was a Methodist. He died on April 6, 1954, and was buried at sea while vacationing with his wife on the RMS Mauretania.

Published works

The Heir of Slaves (1911) 
Written to share his experiences and discuss the significance of education, The Heir of Slaves is told chronologically, detailing major events in Pickens' life. The autobiography recounts memories of his family, his schooling instructors who pushed him to succeed, and the ways in which Pickens was able to accomplish many things in his lifetime and make a name for himself. He describes the teasing of his classmates and how their ridicule motivated him to keep studying, his love for learning, and his determination to prove himself as an accomplished Black man. A major takeaway from Pickens' autobiography is that hard work and persistence pay off.

The Kind of Democracy the Negro Race Expects (1918) 
Pickens asserts in his 1918 article entitled The Kind of Democracy the Negro Race Expects that the word ‘democracy’ means different things to different people. Pickens claims there are six ways to identify what democracy should mean. First is Democracy in Education, which allows equal training for both races, and makes a clear distinction of talent rather than skin color. Second is Democracy in Industry, which justifies a reasonable wealth distribution measured by output and efficiency. Third is Democracy in State—a political system where all are governed by identical rules and policies. Fourth is Democracy without Sex-preferment. This democracy states there is no difference between race or sex in the freedom of people. Fifth is Democracy in Church, which calls for equality within the religion. Lastly, Pickens states that one specific group or race should not have more access to public property or private liberties due to skin color.

Career

Educational career
Pickens was fluent in and instructed several languages, including Latin, Greek, German, and Esperanto. He taught at his first alma mater, Talladega College, for ten years.  Then, in 1915, he began teaching at Wiley College. He was also a professor of sociology and a college dean at Morgan State College.

NAACP
In 1920, Pickens was an active and vocal member of the National Association for the Advancement of Colored People (NAACP). He served as an advocate in this organization for twenty-two years. Pickens was initially considered for the position of field secretary by the association, but instead it was given to James Weldon Johnson in December 1916. On January 12, 1920, Pickens was given the opportunity for the position of assistant field secretary by the NAACP executive secretary, John R. Shillady. Pickens finished teaching for the academic year at Morgan College, while concurrently accepting the position, which provided a $3,000 salary. He also served as a director of branches, 1920–1940.

On January 15, 1923, Pickens joined the eight people group and sent the “Garvey Must Go” letter to the U. S. Department of Justice due to Marcus Garvey's mismanagement of his organization. Feeling later that Garvey's sentence was excessive and racially motivated in August, 1927, Pickens wrote a letter to the New Republic that called for Garvey's release from prison.

Pickens once said, “Color had been made the mark of enslavement and was taken to be also the mark of inferiority; for prejudice does not reason, or it would not be prejudice… If prejudice could reason, it would dispel itself.”

U.S. Treasury
Pickens  was the director of the interracial section of the Treasury Department's Saving Bonds Division from 1941 to 1950 where he was a travelling spokesperson for investing in WWII war bonds. In this role, he is said to have had more direct contact with the Negro masses than any other African American leaders in his time, but also spoke to European-American and mixed audiences.

Other 
His address "Misrule in Hayti" won him the Ten Eyck Prize for oratory, but he would renounce its ideas ten years later. The address led to a conflict between him, Monroe Trotter, and Booker T. Washington.

Other published works include essays and speeches by the names of: "Abraham Lincoln, Man and Statesman" (1909), "The Heir of Slaves" (1911),  "Frederick Douglass and the Spirit of Freedom" (1912), "Fifty Years of Emancipation" (1913), "The Ultimate Effects of Segregation and Discrimination" (1915), "The New Negro" (1916), "The Kind of Democracy the Negro Race Expects" (1918), "The Negro in the Light of the Great War" (1919), "The Vengeance of the Gods" (1922), and "American Aesop" (1926).           

On February 1, 1943, Pickens was one of the 39 men named by Martin Dies as affiliates of "Communist front organizations" and urged Congress to refuse "to appropriate money for their salaries." An amendment was quickly offered to the Treasury and Post Office Appropriations Bill in the House Appropriations Committee to remove funding for the salary of these 39 government employees.
After it was discovered that Pickens was the only employee that would be covered by the appropriations bill, the initial amendment failed and a separate action proceeded to withhold solely the salary of Pickens. A few days later it became known that Pickens was the only black person in the list of 39; the appearance of racism along with a public push to give the named men a "day in court" persuaded the committee to instead create a sub-committee (the Kerr Committee) to investigate the Dies allegations. Pickens wrote to and met with people investigating the allegations. The Kerr committee did not name Pickens as being subversive or unfit.

In 1973, Yale created the William Pickens Prize, named after Pickens Sr. for his contributions to the university. The award is given by The Department of African American Studies to the top senior essayist.

Four generations of the Pickens family have lived and summered in SANS, A traditionally black beach enclave in Sag Harbor's Eastville neighborhood. in 2004 William Pickens III moved there permanently from Queens to the family home in Sag Harbor Hills. A famous guest of the Pickens was Langston Hughes, Pickens Yale college roommate whom was a frequent guest in the 1950s. Pickens grandson is a patron of the Sag Harbor Bay Street Theatre

Bibliography

 Abraham Lincoln, Man and Statesman, 1909
 The Heir of Slaves, 1910/11
 Frederick Douglass and the Spirit of Freedom, 1912
 The Ultimate Effect of Segregation and Discrimination, 1915
 The New Negro: His Political, Civil and Mental Status, and Related Essays, 1916
 The Renaissance of the Negro Race
 The Negro in the Light of the Great War, 1918
 The Kind of Democracy the Negro Expects, 1919
 The Vengeance of the Gods and Three Other Stories of the Real American Color Line, 1922
 Bursting Bonds, Boston: Jordan & More Press, 1923
 American Aesop: Negro and Other Humor, 1926.
 "Aftermath of a Lynching" in Negro Anthology, 1934.

References

Further reading
Brewer, William M. The Journal of Negro History 39:3 (July 1954): 242–244.
Avery, Sheldon. Up from Washington: William Pickens and the Negro Struggle for Equality, University of Delaware Press, 1989.

External links

 
 
 William Pickens (1881-1954) at Who’s Who in Colored America
 Pickens, William (1881-1954) at blackpast.org
 FBI file on William Pickens
 William Pickens Papers. James Weldon Johnson Collection in the Yale Collection of American Literature, Beinecke Rare Book and Manuscript Library.

1881 births
1954 deaths
African-American writers
American writers
Sag Harbor Hills, Azurest, and Ninevah Beach Subdivisions Historic District
20th-century African-American people